Cotton ceiling is a term referring to the purported marginalization of trans women in queer sexual spaces. The term was coined in 2015 by trans porn performer Drew DeVeaux, referring to the difficulties trans women experience in securing lesbian partners.

History 

The term was coined in 2015 by trans porn performer Drew DeVeaux, referring to the feeling of being invisible as a trans woman in queer sexual spaces.

References 

 

LGBT women's culture
Queer culture
Women-related neologisms
Discrimination against transgender people
Feminism and transgender
LGBT-related controversies